The Mobile Black Bears, also known as the Mobile Black Shippers, was a semi-professional baseball team composed entirely of African-American players. The team, which played during the mid-20th century, was based in Mobile, Alabama, and also went on barnstorming tours.

Henry "Hank" Aaron played for the Mobile Black Bears in 1951 while he was still in high school. He was only allowed to play at home games and only on Sundays.  Hall-of-Famer Billy Williams had a brother who also played on this team.

References

African-American history in Mobile, Alabama
Negro league baseball teams
Sports in Mobile, Alabama
Amateur baseball teams in Alabama
Defunct baseball teams in Alabama
Baseball teams disestablished in 1951
Baseball teams established in 1940
1940 establishments in Alabama
1951 disestablishments in Alabama